The Robert E. Lee Monument (also known as the Marianna Confederate Monument) is a U. D. C. memorial built to honor Lee County's Confederate veterans. The monument was carved by the McNeel Marble Co. It is located in Marianna, Arkansas, across from the Lee County Courthouse. Dedicated in 1910, it is one of several monuments built to honor Confederate soldiers. The structure is a local tourist attraction and, since 1996, has been listed in the National Register of Historic Places.

Description
Made entirely of marble, the Marianna Confederate Monument consists of a statue of the General in Chief of the Armies of the Confederate States, Robert E. Lee, in dress uniform. The memorial was sponsored and funded by D. C. Govan Chapter No. 781 of the U. D. C., and dedicated to the "loving memory of Lee County's Confederate soldiers."

See also

List of memorials to Robert E. Lee
National Register of Historic Places listings in Lee County, Arkansas

References

1910 sculptures
Buildings and structures in Lee County, Arkansas
Historic district contributing properties in Arkansas
Monuments and memorials on the National Register of Historic Places in Arkansas
Marianna, Arkansas
National Register of Historic Places in Lee County, Arkansas
Neoclassical architecture in Arkansas
Tourist attractions in Lee County, Arkansas
United Daughters of the Confederacy monuments and memorials in Arkansas
1910 establishments in Arkansas